Yuliya Beygelzimer and Olga Savchuk were the defending champions, however Beygelzimer chose not to participate and Savchuk chose to compete at the 2014 BRD Bucharest Open instead.

Florencia Molinero and Stephanie Vogt won the title, defeating Lourdes Domínguez Lino and Teliana Pereira in the final, 6–2, 6–2.

Seeds

Draw

References 
 Draw

Open Gdf Suez De Biarritz - Doubles